Brissopsis persica is a species of sea urchins of the Family Brissidae. Their armour is covered with spines. Brissopsis persica was first scientifically described in 1940 by Ole Theodor Jensen Mortensen.

See also 

 Brissopsis pacifica
 Brissopsis parallela
 Brissopsis similis

References 

Animals described in 1940
Brissopsis
Taxa named by Ole Theodor Jensen Mortensen